Larry Beavers (born October 7, 1985) is an American football wide receiver and kick returner for the Orlando Predators of the National Arena League (NAL).

High school
Beavers attended Annapolis High School where he played three sports: football, baseball and track.

College
He attended Wesley College a Division III school located in Dover, Delaware. He currently holds the NCAA all-divisions record for kick return touchdowns with 10. He ended his college career with 2,366 receiving yards, becoming the second all-time in college history.

Professional career

Carolina Panthers
After college, Beavers entered the National Football League (NFL) as an undrafted free agent for the Carolina Panthers on May 1, 2009. He was waived by the team at the end of preseason on September 5, 2009.

New Orleans Saints
On May 13, 2010, Beavers was signed by the New Orleans Saints. The activation of Robert Meachem from the physically unable to perform list resulted in Beavers being cut from the team.

Iowa Barnstormers
In 2011, he was signed by the Iowa Barnstormers of the Arena Football League (AFL).

Edmonton Eskimos
On June 17, 2011, Beavers was signed by the Edmonton Eskimos of the Canadian Football League (CFL).

New Orleans VooDoo
In 2013, Beavers was assigned to the New Orleans VooDoo. He was waived by the team on July 3, 2013, only to be reassigned to the VooDoo on July 4, 2013. He was placed on reassignment on June 25, 2015.

Las Vegas Outlaws
On August 6, 2015, Beavers was assigned to the Las Vegas Outlaws.

Cleveland Gladiators
On December 14, 2015, Beavers was assigned to the Cleveland Gladiators. He was placed on reassignment by the team on January 11, 2017. On June 1, 2017, Beavers was assigned to the Gladiators. On June 5, 2017, Beavers was placed on reassignment.

Philadelphia Soul
On June 13, 2017, Beavers was assigned to the Philadelphia Soul of the Arena Football League (AFL). On August 26, 2017, the Soul beat the Tampa Bay Storm in ArenaBowl XXX by a score of 44–40.

Georgia Doom
In January 2018, Beavers signed with the Georgia Doom of the American Arena League (AAL).

Albany Empire
On May 31, 2018, Beavers was assigned to the Albany Empire of the Arena Football League (AFL). On July 2, 2018, he was placed on reassignment.

West Virginia Roughriders
On October 31, 2018, Beavers signed with the West Virginia Roughriders of the American Arena League (AAL). On November 1, 2019, Beavers re-signed with the Roughriders for the 2020 season.

Jersey Flight
On November 2, 2020, Beavers signed with the Jersey Flight of the National Arena League (NAL).

Orlando Predators
On November 26, 2021, Beavers signed with the Orlando Predators of the National Arena League (NAL). On October 31, 2022, Beavers re-signed with the Predators for the 2023 season.

AFL statistics

Stats from ArenaFan:

References

New Orleans Saints players
Carolina Panthers players
Edmonton Elks players
Iowa Barnstormers players
Pittsburgh Power players
New Orleans VooDoo players
1985 births
Living people
African-American players of American football
Wesley Wolverines football players
Sportspeople from Annapolis, Maryland
Players of American football from Maryland
Las Vegas Outlaws (arena football) players
Cleveland Gladiators players
Philadelphia Soul players
American Arena League players
Albany Empire (AFL) players
21st-century African-American sportspeople
20th-century African-American people